Belle Isle is a small  island in the city of Richmond, Virginia. Belle Island lies within the James River, and being owned by the city it serves as a city park. It is accessible to pedestrian and bicycle traffic via a suspension footbridge that runs under the Robert E. Lee Memorial Bridge from the northern shore or via a wooden bridge from the southern shore. Except when the water level of the James is high, it is also reachable by foot from the southern shore via easy boulder-hopping. From Belle Isle, one can see Hollywood Cemetery, the old Tredegar Iron Works, and Richmond City's skyline. Belle Isle has many bike trails around the island, and has a small cliff used for rock climbing instruction.

History
Belle Isle was originally known as Broad Rock Island. It was first explored by Captain John Smith in 1607. In the 18th century the island was occupied by a fishery. In 1814, the Old Dominion Iron and Nail Company completed a nail factory. During the 1860s, the island was inhabited by a village complete with a school, church, and general store.

Civil War

The island served as a prison for Union soldiers during the American Civil War. Between 1862 and 1865, the island was home to about 30,000 POWs and as many as 1,000 died, though accounts vary with the South claiming the death rate was low, while the North claimed it was very high. The Battle of Walkerton was the result of a failed Union attempt to free them.

In  1864, Peter DeWitt, Assistant Surgeon at Jarvis Hospital, Baltimore, received a number of prisoners recently released from the Prisoner of War camp at Belle Isle. He described the "great majority" of the patients as being:
in a semi-state of nudity...laboring under such diseases as chronic diarrhoea, phthisis pulmonalis, scurvy, frost bites, general debility, caused by starvation, neglect and exposure. Many of them had partially lost their reason, forgetting even the date of their capture, and everything connected with their antecedent history. They resemble, in many respect, patients laboring under cretinism. They were filthy in the extreme, covered in vermin...nearly all were extremely emaciated; so much so that they had to be cared for even like infants.

In May 1864, Lucius Eugene Chittenden, Assistant Secretary of the Treasury under President Abraham Lincoln was sent by the president to investigate freed prisoners from Belle Isle and gave his eyewitness account in, "Recollections of President Lincoln and His Administration," published in the late 1890s. He related the shock Lincoln shared at learning that Union prisoners had been left by the Confederates to freeze and starve to death in the shadow of the Confederate Capital.

Twentieth century
The Virginia Electric Power Company built and operated a hydroelectric power plant on the island between 1904 and 1963.

Belle Isle is briefly mentioned in Chapter III of MacKinlay Kantor's Pulitzer Prize-winning novel about the Civil War, "Andersonville" (1955).  Conditions at the prison camp are described in more detail in Chapters IX and XIII.

The original Lee Bridge was built over the island in 1934 and replaced by the current version in 1988.

In the 2001 movie Hannibal, the power plant can be seen as Agent Starling runs across the bridge on the south side of the island.

Belle Isle Park today

Belle Isle was formally made into a park in 1973. 
Belle Isle offers Richmonders the opportunity to view wildlife in its natural habitat, at a location only a few minutes from the heart of the city.  Songbirds,  ducks, cormorants and blue herons are a common sight. Squirrels, other small mammals, amphibians and reptiles also inhabit the island.

Belle Isle is a great place for people with a love for the outdoors. Popular activities of adults and youths alike include walking the trails, swimming in the James River, rock jumping, sunbathing, birdwatching, kayaking in the James, and boulder-top picnicking only feet away from fierce rapids. The island also offers many old and ruined buildings, among other run-down sites along the trails.

Sections of trail are a part of the East Coast Greenway.

Because it contains many trees and is remote from constant human presence, the island is home to some animal wildlife, an uncommon presence within the city's borders.

See also
 Libby Prison

References

External links

 
Belle Isle on RichmondWiki.org 
Prisoner of War Camps
City of Richmond National Register of Historic Places (1995) Registration form for "Belle Isle"

Coordinates on Wikidata
James River (Virginia)
American Civil War prison camps
Defunct prisons in Virginia
Richmond, Virginia in the American Civil War
Virginia municipal and county parks
Geography of Richmond, Virginia
Parks in Richmond, Virginia
Historic districts on the National Register of Historic Places in Virginia
National Register of Historic Places in Richmond, Virginia
Temporary populated places on the National Register of Historic Places